Geronimo de Bobadilla, also Jerónimo de Bobadilla, (1630–1709) was a Spanish painter.

He was born at Antequera, a small town in the vicinity of Málaga, and got married in 1659. According to Palomino, he was a scholar of Francisco Zurbarán, whose manner he followed. He excelled in painting historical subjects of a medium size and perspective views. He used a peculiar varnish on his pictures, which Murillo compared to crystal. He was a great collector of academic figures, drawings, models, and sketches of celebrated artists. He was one of the founders of the Academy at Seville in 1660, and according to art historian Juan Agustín Ceán Bermúdez, continued to support it until his death, which took place in that city in 1680.

In his few known works was a drawing of St. Joseph with the Christ Child signed in 1685 (Kunsthalle, Hamburg) issued by August L. Mayer, who noted the Murillo stylistic closeness, and four paintings with motifs of the infancy of Christ preserved in private collections and signed on the back with the notation that they were sold for 180 reales each. The Hermitage Museum also attributed to him the Virgin with the Christ Child Asleep, dated 1668.

References

 Ceán Bermúdez, Juan Agustín (1800). Historical Dictionary of the most distinguished teachers of the Fine Arts in Spain. Madrid, t. I, p. 151.
 Clavijo Garcia, Augustine, "A Zurbarán forgotten: the Seville Jeronimo Bobadilla (1703)", Baetica. Art Studies, Geography and History, 6, 1982, 49–82.
 Palomino, Antonio (1988). The pictorial museum optical scale III. The picturesque Spanish Parnassus laureate .. Madrid: Aguilar SA Editions. .
 Pérez Sánchez, Alfonso E. (1992). Baroque Painting in Spain 1600–1750. Madrid: Ediciones Chair. .

Attribution:
 

1630 births
1709 deaths
People from Antequera
Spanish Baroque painters
17th-century Spanish painters
Spanish male painters